San Teodoro may refer to:

Italy
San Teodoro, Sicily, comune in the Metropolitan City of Messina, Sicily
San Teodoro, Sardinia, comune in the Province of Olbia-Tempio, Sardinia
San Teodoro, Rome, 6th-century church of Rome
San Teodoro, Pavia, medieval church in Pavia

Philippines
San Teodoro, Oriental Mindoro, a municipality
San Teodoro, Bunawan, Agusan del Sur, a barangay

See also 
 Saint Theodore (disambiguation)